Chesapeake & Ohio 614 is a class "J-3-A" 4-8-4 "Greenbrier" (Northern) type steam locomotive built in June 1948 by the Lima Locomotive Works in Lima, Ohio for the Chesapeake and Ohio Railway (C&O) as a member of the J-3-A class. As one of the last commercially built steam locomotives in the United States, the locomotive was built with the primary purpose of hauling long, heavy, high speed express passenger trains for the Chesapeake & Ohio Railway such as the George Washington and the Fast Flying Virginian. Retired from active service in the late 1950s, the 614 was preserved and placed on display at the B&O Railroad Museum in Baltimore, Maryland. Between 1979 and 1980, restoration work on the locomotive to operating condition took place and it was used for extensive mainline excursion service from the early 1980s until the late 1990s. Today, the locomotive is on display at the C&O Railway Heritage Center in Clifton Forge, Virginia.

History and revenue career

Most railroads called their 4-8-4s "Northerns", which is short for the railroad first using the 4-8-4 type, Northern Pacific Railroad. The workers of the C&O could not see naming these locomotives "Northerns" as the railroad was based in the southeast. The famous Greenbrier Hotel in White Sulphur Springs, West Virginia, a major resort on the C&O mainline, was the inspiration for the name "Greenbrier" applied to these 4-8-4s.

The C&O had a total of 12 4-8-4s, with the first five numbered 600-604 built in 1935, with the designation J-3. In 1942, two more were ordered from Lima numbered 605–606. In 1948, the design changed slightly and the 610-614 were produced, with the J-3-A designation. No. 614 was originally retired in 1952, but three years later, it, as well as No. 610 were brought back into revenue service to pull heavy freight trains in favor of the upcoming freight traffic on most American railroads. While being brought back into service, however, No. 614 was renumbered to 611, since there was a power shortage on the C&O as to alleviate any confusion with some leased 4-8-4s from the Richmond, Fredericksburg and Potomac Railroad, one of which was also numbered 614. The original C&O 611 remained out of service.

After just one year of revenue freight service, No. 614 was retired again and it was placed in storage with a group of other C&O steam locomotives in the form of a ‘scrap line’ in front of the C&O diesel shops in Russell, Kentucky where it remained for almost two decades.

Excursion service
In 1975, No. 614, as well as 2-8-4 Kanawha No. 2705 and 2-6-6-2 No. 1309, were sent to the B&O Railroad Museum in Baltimore, Maryland and were cosmetically restored for static display, although in 2014, No. 1309 was purchased by the Western Maryland Scenic Railroad in Cumberland, Maryland and restored to operating condition on December 31, 2020.

During 1979, Ross Rowland traded Reading T1 No. 2101, which was previously damaged in a roundhouse fire, to the museum in exchange for the 614. She was restored over the next 18 months with a cost of $1.5 million. During the restoration, 614 was given an auxiliary tender, doubling her water capacity to 50,000 gallons. This allowed the 614 to run for longer times without having to refuel as much. The Chessie Safety Express was 614's first major run, bringing her a bit of spotlight in the process. After the successful system tour, 614 was kept in Hagerstown, Maryland until 1985. American Coal Enterprise was developing a modern steam locomotive to be used as an alternative to rising oil costs by burning coal, known as the ACE 3000 Project. The 614 was modified for better performance under the guidance of David Wardale, and fitted with testing equipment to measure the performance of the engine. For several weeks in January and February 1985, 614 (now 614-T, symbolizing it as testing) hauled coal trains between Huntington and Hinton, West Virginia. The 614's fuel consumption costs were actually lower than most diesel locomotives operating at that time.

In 1992, Rowland's vision of the 21st Century Limited was taking shape. To give the public an idea of the train, one side of 614 was decorated in a futuristic way with a blue streamlined shrouding and centered headlight. The 614 also came back to its former home at the B&O Railroad Museum for temporary display. In 1995, 614 was moved to the New Hope and Ivyland Railroad in New Hope, Pennsylvania for a complete overhaul. It was then used for a series of popular excursions between Hoboken, New Jersey and Port Jervis, New York in conjunction with New Jersey Transit (NJT) and co-sponsored by the Volunteer Railroaders Association between 1996 and 1998.

Current status
The 614 was required to pull 26 cars at 79 mph on some sections, and maintain speed up several hills. During this time, the 614 was equipped with cab signals, 26L brakes, speed control and an MU stand. The 614 was moved to storage on the Reading and Northern Railroad in Port Clinton, Pennsylvania. In 2000, Rowland put the 614 up for auction at the NJT maintenance facility, but no buyers were interested. The locomotive is still maintained by Iron Horse Enterprises, the most recent servicing of the locomotive being in 2006.

In 2010, discussions began between Rowland and Jim Justice, owner of the Greenbrier Resort in White Sulfur Springs, West Virginia, and current governor of West Virginia. The resort owner had been interested in running steam-powered excursion trains from Greenbrier to Washington DC. To be known as the "Greenbrier Express", Justice planned to use steam and diesel power in the project, but would have needed cooperation from CSX Transportation, the Buckingham Branch Railroad and Amtrak. In January 2011, the 614 was moved to the Virginia Museum of Transportation in Roanoke, Virginia for its Thoroughbreds of Steam exhibit. In May 2011, the 614 was again moved to the C&O Railway Heritage Center in Clifton Forge, Virginia. From there, it was repainted in preparation for display for the Greenbrier Presidential Express. Unfortunately, the Greenbrier Express project was cancelled in May 2012 due to lack of funding and capacity problems on the CSX portion of the route, where a lack of passing sidings makes it difficult for Eastbound trains to gain headway against the flow of Westbound empty coal trains. The diesels and passenger cars were auctioned off and the 614 continues to sit on display at Clifton Forge. As of 2023, the 614 is still painted in the Greenbrier Presidential Express scheme.

References

External links

The Chesapeake and Ohio Greenbriers, Including The 614
Chesapeake & Ohio Railroad Steam Locomotive #614
ACE 3000 and the testing with the 614
The 1980-1981 Chessie Safety Express with C&O 614

Individual locomotives of the United States
4-8-4 locomotives
0614
Lima locomotives
Passenger locomotives
Railway locomotives introduced in 1948
Standard gauge locomotives of the United States
Preserved steam locomotives of Virginia